Modřice is a town in Brno-Country District in the South Moravian Region of the Czech Republic. It has about 5,300 inhabitants.

Geography

It lies in the Dyje–Svratka Valley. It is situated on the right bank of the Svratka River.

History
The first written mention of Modřice is from 1141. There used to be a castle owned by the Olomouc bishops. In the 13th century, Germanic settlers came and mixed with the original Slavic population.

In the first half of the 20th century, Germans formed majority of the population. After the World War II, German inhabitants were expelled and the municipality was resettled by Czechs. Modřice became a town in 1994.

Demographics

Transport
The D2 motorway runs next to the town.

Sights
The Church of Saint Gotthard is the landmark of the town. The original Romanesque structure was completely rebuilt in the 1780s. It has preserved Romanesque core, Renaissance portal and late Baroque tower.

Notable people
Christian Mayer (1719–1783), German astronomer
Leander Czerny (1859–1944), Austrian entomologist
Jiří Ventruba (1950–2021), neurosurgeon and politician

References

External links

Cities and towns in the Czech Republic
Populated places in Brno-Country District